Richard Goldenberg (born 21 November 1947) is a French chess FIDE Master (FM) and International Correspondence Chess Master (1986), a two-times French Chess Championship silver medalist (1978, 1981).

Biography
In the mid-1970s to the mid-1980s Richard Goldenberg was one of the leading French chess players. He participated in the finals of the French Chess Championships many times. Richard Goldenberg has won silver medals twice in these tournaments: in 1978 in Castelnaudary he ranked 2nd and in 1981 in Vitrolles he shared 1st with Jean-Luc Seret but lost additional play-off 0:2.

Richard Goldenberg played for France in the Chess Olympiads:
 In 1976, at first reserve board in the 22nd Chess Olympiad in Haifa (+4, =1, -6),
 In 1980, at first reserve board in the 24th Chess Olympiad in La Valletta (+1, =4, -1).

Richard Goldenberg played for France in the European Team Chess Championship preliminaries:
 In 1977, at sixth board in the 6th European Team Chess Championship preliminaries (+1, =1, -4),
 In 1983, at eighth board in the 8th European Team Chess Championship preliminaries (+0, =2, -0).

Richard Goldenberg played for France in the World Student Team Chess Championship:
 In 1972, at first board in the 19th World Student Team Chess Championship in Graz (+4, =3, -5).

Richard Goldenberg played for France in the Men's Chess Mitropa Cups:
 In 1978, at first board in the 3rd Chess Mitropa Cup in Ciocco (+1, =2, -3),
 In 1981, at second board in the 6th Chess Mitropa Cup in Luxembourg (+1, =2, -2),
 In 1982, at first board in the 7th Chess Mitropa Cup in Bourgoin-Jallieu (+0, =3, -0) and won team gold medal,
 In 1983, at second board in the 8th Chess Mitropa Cup in Lienz (+1, =2, -1).

In later years, Richard Goldenberg active participated in correspondence chess tournaments. He participated in 13th World Correspondence Chess Championship final (1989–1998). In 1986, Richard Goldenberg was awarded the ICCF International Correspondence Chess Master (IM) title.

References

External links

1947 births
Living people
Sportspeople from Paris
French chess players
Chess FIDE Masters
Chess Olympiad competitors